International School of Koje (ISK), recently renamed Atherton International School (AIS),  is a privately funded international school located in Okpo, Geoje, South Korea. It was originally founded as OIS (Okpo International School) however their name changed in 2014/2015. Currently they are accredited for the IEYC, the IPC and the IMYC as well as Cambridge IGCSEs and A levels.

References

External links

International schools in South Korea
Geoje